Allentown is a defunct train station in Allentown, Pennsylvania. It was constructed by the Central Railroad of New Jersey (CNJ) and Reading Railroad from 1888–1889. The station closed in 1967 with the cessation of CNJ passenger service. The station is located one block east of the Lehigh Valley Railroad's Allentown station.

History

Early railroads 
During the first half of the 19th century, Allentown was primarily a small market town for farmers. It was not until 1851 that the first railroad reached Allentown with the chartering of the Delaware, Lehigh, Schuylkill and Susquehanna Railroad, which later became the Lehigh Valley Railroad. A small station was built in 1855 which linked the city with Easton and Mauch Chunk. However, the railroad was not a major factor in local transportation.

During the Civil War, the industrial growth along the Lehigh River saw the establishment of industry in the city. To be successful, the industries needed cheap and reliable transportation systems to haul the raw materials and the finished products. The Lehigh Canal, built in the 1820s was the major transport link used to haul anthracite coal from northeast Pennsylvania to the factories, but a major flood in 1862 seriously damaged the Canal.  Charters were issued to two railroad companies, the Lehigh Valley and Lehigh and Susquehanna (later leased to the Central Railroad of New Jersey) to build lines into Allentown. The Reading Lines entered the city soon afterwards. Along with the freight railroads, Allentown became a destination for immigrants who found work in one of Allentown's textile mills and factories.

Industrial era 
It was in the late 1880s that both railroads built elaborate stations in Allentown, and all lines serving Allentown converged at the two stations. LV rail lines ran south into Allentown from Mauch Chunk, primarily along the west side of the Lehigh River. The lines crossed under the Tilghman Street Bridge past LV freight yard north of Walnut Street, then under Linden Street to the passenger station. The lines continued south out of Allentown, then turned east, following the west side of the river through Rittersville, Fountain Hill and South Bethlehem under the Hill to Hill Bridge, past Bethlehem Steel to Easton.

CNJ tracks ran along the east side of the Lehigh from Mauch Chunk, then crossed the river where American Parkway now ends and turns onto North Dauphin Street. The former CNJ crossover bridge remains standing derelict crossing the river. South of Allentown, CNJ turned east and again crossed the Lehigh River, following the west side through CNJ's Allentown yard, which is still operated by Norfolk Southern Railway.

Both lines into Allentown were double-tracked, paralleling each other into their respective stations following American Parkway, which was later built on the abandoned railbed. A shared, separate double-tracked freight line ran to the east of the passenger stations.

During World War I, both stations were used by the United States Army Ambulance Service (USAAS) that operated Camp Crane, a training camp for Army Ambulance drivers and support personnel. Thousands of soldiers arrived in Allentown at the stations, then were transported to the training camp. After graduating from training, the stations became pre-embarkation point, with thousands of men moving in and out rapidly, usually arriving and leaving on trains in the middle of the night.

The Allentown stations provided passenger rail service for decades to Scranton, Reading, Harrisburg, New York City, Philadelphia and other points along the nation's inter-city rail network.  Major named trains included the Queen of the Valley (CNJ/Reading, Jersey City–Harrisburg), Interstate Express (Reading/Lackawanna, Syracuse–Philadelphia), Scranton Flyer/Philadelphia Flyer (Reading, Philadelphia–Scranton).

Decline

LV had its peak of passengers during the 1940s, however during the 1950s, as the Interstate Highway network grew and long-distance bus and airline service expanded, passenger patronage declined. LV petitioned the Interstate Commerce Commission to cut back its unprofitable passenger service. LV ended service to Allentown on February 4, 1961.

The Allentown Terminal Station was operated jointly by CNJ and the Reading Railroad (RDG). Both CNJ and RDG leased each other's lines in Pennsylvania, and suffered the same fate in terms of reduced passenger ridership. RDG Allentown–Harrisburg passenger service ended in June 1963, terminating its Allentown service at the CNJ station by 1965. It continued operations to Jersey City, New Jersey for two more years before ending all passenger service from Allentown in 1967.

After the end of passenger rail service to Allentown, both LV and CNJ stations were closed and abandoned. Both stations became derelict and LV station was demolished in 1972 with the widening of the Hamilton Street Bridge over Jordan Creek. Today only some rusting steel beams extending over the Creek remain.

CNJ rail lines were dismantled and Hamilton Street was resurfaced over where the lines had run.  The CNJ station remained derelict until 1980, when the property was restored as a restaurant. The renovated property went through several owners (Depot Restaurant, Gingerbread Man, B&G Station, Jillian's Billiard Cafe) over the next two decades, lastly being called Banana Joe's which opened on Labor Day 2001. The property abruptly closed in September 2007 after a shooting which caused a dramatic drop-off in patrons. It has remained closed and vacant since then; the building slowly deteriorating.

See also

 List of historic places in Allentown, Pennsylvania

References

External links
 LEHIGH & SUSQUEHANNA DIVISION PACKERTON JUNCTION TO WK INTERLOCKING MP 116.68 TO MP 90.20

Railway stations in the United States opened in 1890
Railway stations closed in 1967
History of Allentown, Pennsylvania
Buildings and structures in Allentown, Pennsylvania
Transportation in Allentown, Pennsylvania
Former Central Railroad of New Jersey stations
Former Reading Company stations
Transportation buildings and structures in Lehigh County, Pennsylvania
Former railway stations in Pennsylvania